This is a list of German television related events from 2014.

Events
13 March - Elaiza are selected to represent Germany at the 2014 Eurovision Song Contest with their song "Is It Right". They are selected to be the fifty-ninth German Eurovision entry during Unser Song für Dänemark held at the Lanxess Arena in Cologne.
3 May - Aneta Sablik wins the eleventh season of Deutschland sucht den Superstar.
9 May - 14-year-old Danyiom Mesmer wins the second season of The Voice Kids.
30 May - Singer and winner of the first season of Deutschland sucht den Superstar Alexander Klaws and his partner Isabel Edvardsson win the seventh season of Let's Dance.
13 July - Germany beat Argentina 1–0 to win the 2014 World Cup at Rio de Janeiro, Brazil.
29 August - Aaron Troschke wins the second season of Promi Big Brother.
12 December - Charley Ann Schmutzler wins the fourth season of The Voice of Germany.
20 December - 26-year-old pop singer and Travestie artist Marcel Kaupp wins the eighth season of Das Supertalent.

Debuts
 Alexander the Great (25 October 2014 – 2 November 2014)

Television shows

1950s
Tagesschau (1952–present)

1960s
 heute (1963–present)

1970s
 heute-journal (1978–present)
 Tagesthemen (1978–present)

1980s
Wetten, dass..? (1981-2014)
Lindenstraße (1985–present)

1990s
Gute Zeiten, schlechte Zeiten (1992–present)
Unter uns (1994–present)
Verbotene Liebe (1995-2015)
Schloss Einstein (1998–present)
In aller Freundschaft (1998–present)
Wer wird Millionär? (1999–present)

2000s
Deutschland sucht den Superstar (2002–present)
Let's Dance (2006–present)
Das Supertalent (2007–present)

2010s
The Voice of Germany (2011–present)
Promi Big Brother (2013–present)

Ending this year
Wetten, dass..? (1981-2014)

Births

Deaths

See also 
2014 in Germany

References